Atarshumki I (also Bar-Guš) was the King of Bit Agusi in ancient Syria; he was the son of Arames. The capital of Bit Agusi was Arpad.

History
Like his father, Atarshumki was rebellious against the Assyrian supremacy. At that time, Assyria was ruled by Shamshi-Adad V and then by Adad-nirari III.

Atarshumki tried to build a coalition with his neighbors against the Assyrians; finally, in 796, Adad-nirari III launched a military campaign in the area, and subjugated it.

The territorial conflict between Hamath and Arpad

The Antakya stele (de) is believed to belong to the later years of Adad-Nirari III. This is when the prominent official Shamshi-ilu, who is involved with the inscription, became active. Based on this, the inscription is believed to date in the 780s BC.

"The Antakya inscription describes the interference of the Assyrian King in a territorial conflict between Atarsumki, king of Arpad, and Zakkur, king of Hamath ... At that time, both kings were vassals of Adad-nirari III ... the settlement was established in favour of the previously hostile king of Arpad ... The reason for preferring Arpad is clear: it had broken up the lines of the Syro-Hittite coalition, and opened before Adad-nirari III the way to the south, to Damascus."

Notes

See also
Aram-Damascus

Sources
German Wikipedia

Bibliography
 A. K. Grayson, In: The Cambridge Ancient History Vol. 3, 1, Cambridge 1982, p.272
 John David Hawkins, In: The Cambridge Ancient History Vol. 3, 1, Cambridge 1982, pp 400–408
 Nili Wazana: Water division in border agreements. In: State Archives of Assyria Bulletin 10, 1996, 55-66  PDF

External links
The Antakya stela A boundary marker between Ataršumki of Arpad and Zakkur of Hamath

Aramean kings
Syro-Hittite kings
Ancient Syria
History of Aleppo
8th-century BC Aramean kings